Jonathan Pearce may refer to:

 Jonathan Pearce (commentator) (born 1959), English football commentator
 Jonathan Pearce (fighter) (born 1992), American mixed martial artist
 Jonathan Pearce (cricketer) (born 1957), English cricketer